Rómulo Betancourt won the 1958 Venezuelan general elections for Democratic Action and held the Presidency of Venezuela from February 13, 1959, to March 13, 1964. Betancourt started his second presidency (his first had been under El Trienio Adeco) as a moderate, except on the issue of dictatorships, instituting the idealistic foreign policy (known as "the Betancourt doctrine") that Venezuela would not recognize dictatorial government anywhere, particularly in Latin America, but including the USSR. One significant domestic policy was land reform, with land largely from expropriated private landholdings redistributed to around 200,000 families.

Betancourt's term in office saw the split of the Revolutionary Left Movement from Democratic Action in 1960, several brief military rebellions, and the development of a guerrilla movement that included the Armed Forces of National Liberation (FALN). Betancourt survived an assassination attempt on June 24, 1960, blamed on Rafael Leonidas Trujillo, dictator of the Dominican Republic.

Foreign policy

Betancourt instituted the idealistic foreign policy that Venezuela would not recognize dictatorial government anywhere, particularly in Latin America, but including the USSR, an interpretation that pleased the United States. The "Betancourt doctrine" proved unrealistic, for Venezuelan democratization occurred in the midst of a marked tendency in the rest of Latin America towards authoritarianism. He was also unrealistic in reviving Venezuela's claim on British Guiana up to the Essequibo river (which had been settled by international arbitration half a century earlier, following the Venezuela Crisis of 1895) and he had all maps of Venezuela show this large territory as part of the country albeit as disputed.

In other things, Betancourt demonstrated a realistic approach. He respected the virtual autonomy of the armed forces and he did all he could to keep on the good side of Washington. Betancourt held two particular grudges: against ex-dictator Marcos Pérez Jiménez, for obvious reasons, and against Rafael Leónidas Trujillo, the Dominican dictator against whom in his youth, with José Figueres of Costa Rica, he had carried on an active subversive opposition. The first of these targets of his ire led him to undercut developmental projects which would have been beneficial to his country. His hatred for Trujillo almost cost him his life after a 1960 failed bombing attack, although in the end it was Trujillo who lost his life.

Pérez Jiménez had gone from the Dominican Republic to Miami, but Betancourt had him accused of filching in the state treasury (justifiably, although only circumstantial evidence existed) and the Venezuelan supreme court convicted him. Venezuela asked the John F. Kennedy administration for the extradition of Pérez Jiménez, and, to everyone's surprise, the USA complied, betraying an unconditional ally it had once bestowed a Medal Merit in 1953. Pérez Jiménez was first held in the Miami county jail and was finally sent to Venezuela to finish the term in a comfortable prison. In all he spent five years in prison.

Betancourt's mines and hydrocarbons  minister, Juan Pablo Pérez Alfonso, was responsible for conceiving and creating OPEC and the Corporacion Venezolana del Petroleo (CVP).

Relations with Cuba
Fidel Castro occupied Havana in Cuba on January 1, 1959 in the Cuban Revolution, shortly before Betancourt took office on the 13th of February. He was considered a reformist compared with the unscrupulous dictator Fulgencio Batista, a man who as a sergeant had carried out his first coup in Cuba back in 1933. The first sign that Castro was different from all the caudillos that Latin America had ever had, was that he ordered the public executions of over a hundred Batista soldiers and police officers, although he himself had benefited by a pardon from Batista when he had tried to take over a military barracks in 1953. Once in power, Castro never concealed his anti-Americanism and in 1961 he claimed that he was and had always been a Marxist-Leninist. Betancourt wanted to back the American proposal at an Organization of American States conference in Costa Rica to expel Cuba from that body, which was achieved, but his own foreign minister, Ignacio Luis Arcaya, refused to obey and abstained in the final vote.

Development policy
Pérez Jiménez had left in place the basic plans and projects for the further modernization and for the heavy industrialization of Venezuela.

Guayana had large iron deposits as Cerro Bolivar and San Isidro. The infrastructure for exploiting them was laid by US Steel as well as the complementary huge steelworks by Innocenti. Communications had been a priority and Venezuela was endowed with a network of roads and bridges that covered the territory where over 90% of the population lived. Half or more of these were improved surface, and all they lacked was the asphalt paving. This system linked with the many blacktops that the oil companies had built in eastern and western Venezuela. These had been traced for exploration and exploitation, but they also served for the use of the general population and were now linked to the national highway system.

Pérez Jiménez had built motorways from Caracas to Valencia and from Caracas to the port at La Guaira. By 1955, one could drive from one end to the other of Venezuela in a matter of days where before it would have taken weeks - months if the rainy season hampered travel. Also, Pérez Jiménez had begun the construction of a coherent railway system, although he had not had time to do more than the railroad from Puerto Cabello to Barquisimeto. Pérez Jiménez had also created government subsidiaries, called "institutos autónomos" (autonomous institutes) — the "autonomous" was supposed to mean non-political, but its real function was to allow them to negotiate foreign loans — that were to build waterworks and electric power plants in all important urban centers. He thus had started the construction of the huge Macagua Dam on Caroni river, which in time was to provide the entire country with a reliable electric grid. Betancourt's government adopted the plans and the administrative system to carry them out that the dictatorship had left in place.

But the politics of repudiation had to have its pound of flesh, and Betancourt and his cabinet also canceled some crucial public works merely because Pérez Jiménez had initiated them. The railroads were scrapped with the argument that Venezuela did not need them having so much asphalt it could expand the road network at a lower cost. Pérez Jiménez had built a large reservoir in the central llanos with the irrigation potential to make Venezuela an exporter of rice. The adecos in power built instead a small hydroelectric dam for Caracas upstream and effectively starved the rice-producing scheme which was only realized to a fraction of its planned area.

In time, most of the land that would have been irrigated was converted into cattle ranches, the traditional but at that point inessential llanos economic activity. In addition to the government–financed development projects, Pérez Jiménez was not averse to protectionism and incentives to local industries, but the Betancourt government made a fetish of import substitution and instead of allowing the free importation of industrial goods for which Venezuela did not have the training, it tried to force foreign suppliers to build plants in the country for the assembly or packaging of finished products that were allowed tariff-free into the country. The automobile "industry" was the import substitution model postulated by CEPAL.

Venezuela still does not manufacture car engines, and all that the Betancourt and successive governments achieved was to assemble cars, which did give some Venezuelans employment — some parts suppliers, like makers of windshields, also prospered  —but made the cars more costly than if they had been imported whole from Detroit to feed Venezuela's car-mania. But economic nostrums and interventionism went beyond that. The government had opted for "guided planning", and what this meant was that businesses were strictly regulated through a system of controls that went from the permission to start one to limits on where and on how they should operate. The author of this "developmental strategy" was José Antonio Mayobre, a former communist and Betancourt's economic guru.

All of this required more government employees and again, as after 1945, the Venezuelan bureaucracy bloomed, as it would go on doing with each new president until it reached its height under Carlos Andres Pérez, Betancourt's personal secretary and future president. Another trusted Betancourt minister was Leopoldo Sucre Figarella, who considered that a long bridge to complete the Caracas-Valencia motorway was unnecessarily expensive, so he had the six-lane highway constructed along the mountain contour.

"Alliance for Progress"
The Kennedy administration in the United States of America underwrote all the economic policies of the Betancourt government through the Alliance for Progress, which used Venezuela as the exemplar showcase for all of Latin America. The ideology behind this came in a package called "development economics" expressed in a work by the economist W.W. Rostow, who described economic progress with the "take-off metaphor": A developing economy was like an airplane that got its motors running, taxied to the head of the runway, then sped along until it took off, which was the historical moment of self-sustaining growth. There were many other ideas of this sort. Another was the "trickle down effect", which posited that, as an economy developed, its lower social strata would benefit from the achievements of free enterprise. But in Venezuela free enterprise was a very relative concept because of the proliferation of government regulations, not that Betancourt had anything like a "command economy" in mind, for the rights of private property were never meddled with. The trickle down effect took the form of political clientelism through which state hand-outs and local state-created posts, some purely nominal, were financed at the lower pardo levels. This was not only the rule in the Caracas shantytowns but also in the rural and semi-rural areas where adeco loyalties were firm. The Betancourt government expanded educational facilities of all sorts on a large scale. New universities were created; vocational and craft schools were founded. Pérez Jiménez's immigration policy was halted. Paradoxically, Venezuelans were not doing basic jobs, such as plumbing and carpentry, and a new and larger wave of immigration swept over the country mainly from Colombia, much of it illegal. Venezuela became for its neighbor what the USA was for Mexico. There was no pardo discrimination — as such this had never existed in Venezuela — but when it came to upper echelon positions in and out of the government, Venezuelan whites and foreigners were generally preferred to the average Venezuelan.

Land reform
During the brief first period of democracy (El Trienio Adeco, 1945–48), the Democratic Action government had redistributed land which it said had been gained illicitly by members of previous governments, and in mid-1948 it enacted an agrarian reform law. However most of the land redistributed in this way was returned to its previous owners during the 1948-58 dictatorship of Marcos Pérez Jiménez. After the 1958 restoration of democracy brought Betancourt to office again, a new land reform law was enacted in March 1960, with reform in the early 1960s concentrated in the northeastern states of Miranda, Aragua and Carabobo, and coming largely from expropriated private landholdings. The reform was accompanied by a considerable increase in agricultural production. Ultimately the reform saw about 200,000 families receive transfers of land, largely in the early 1960s.

Internal unrest

But Betancourt in power primarily faced the problem of merely surviving, even in a personal sense. The underlying cause of the instability was that the 1958 elections had settled the issue of who had the right to govern democratically, but this was not as many disgruntled officers saw it because they still felt very strongly that it was the armed forces and not the "people" who had overthrown Pérez Jiménez. This created an indescribable mélange of partisans of Pérez Jiménez, rightists who were calling Betancourt a communist in disguise, and new insubordinate officers who were clamoring for a "real revolution". During his first year in power Betancourt was the object of an assassination attempt through a remote-control car bomb. He suffered minor lesions. The Dominican dictator Trujillo, who himself was assassinated by his own disaffected officers in 1961, was blamed, but the actual perpetrators were Venezuelans. Then, military insurrections in  Barcelona (1961),  Carúpano and in Puerto Cabello, which were supposed to take place simultaneously in 1962, instead followed upon each other. The promoter among the military of these rebellious movements was a then little-known personage called Manuel Quijada. The military held their part of the 1958 agreement with Betancourt and suppressed them. But the strangest of all the movements against Betancourt, and the least effectual — although El Carupanazo (Carúpano) and El Porteñazo (Puerto Cabello) can only be described as aberrations — came from the communist left.

Venezuelan leftists, and especially the communists, were watching Fidel Castro in Cuba, and they came to the conclusion, not entirely unlike that of the rightist officers who had plotted against Betancourt, that the 1958 "revolution" had been hijacked at its most popular and effervescent and that they were going to attempt a repeat of Castro's Cuban Revolution. Urban guerrillas were formed even as in Congress leftists were clamoring against Betancourt. The Revolutionary Left Movement split from Democratic Action in 1960 and later supported the Armed Forces of National Liberation (FALN). The subversive cells carried out some sensational acts, one being the daylight robbery of an exhibition of Impressionist painters sponsored by France at the Venezuelan art museum. In another more deadly action they shot and killed eight Venezuelan soldiers in the back to steal their weapons. Betancourt put his aide Pérez in charge of repression. The leftist deputies were arrested, and the urban insurrection was brought under control, but the communists and their leftist allies took to the hills with the intention of repeating the pattern of Castro's rural guerrillas.

Carlos Andrés Pérez, later twice President of Venezuela, was Minister of the Interior during this time (1959-1964) and played a key role in the early Venezuelan government response to the guerrilla movement.

References

History of Venezuela
Betancourt, Rómulo